Greenwich College may refer to
Royal Naval College, Greenwich
Greenwich Community College